Mihály Fodor (born 16 March 1950) is a Hungarian wrestler. He competed in the men's freestyle 62 kg at the 1976 Summer Olympics.

References

External links
 

1950 births
Living people
Hungarian male sport wrestlers
Olympic wrestlers of Hungary
Wrestlers at the 1976 Summer Olympics
Sportspeople from Hajdú-Bihar County